Waiters are people who serve food and drink.

Waiters may also refer to:

 Dion Waiters (born 1991), American basketball player
 Granville Waiters (1961–2021), American basketball player
 Mel Waiters (1956–2015), American musician
 Tony Waiters (1937–2020), English footballer and manager
 Van Waiters (born 1965), American football player

See also
 Waiter (disambiguation)